Attractor may refer to:

 Attractor, a feature of some dynamic systems
 Great Attractor, a gravity anomaly in intergalactic space
 Fishing light attractor, a fishing aid
 Bug attractor, in insect eradication
 "Attractor", a song by the American band Bright from the album The Albatross Guest House
 Evolutionary attractor, a tendency in evolution

See also
 
 
 Attract (disambiguation)
 Tractor (disambiguation)
Strange Attractor (disambiguation)